Powerlifting at the 2019 Pacific Games in Apia, Samoa was held on 18–19 July 2019 at the Faleata Sports Complex in Tuanaimato. The competition included eight men's and seven women's weight classes.

Medal summary

Medal table

Men

Women

See also
 Powerlifting at the Pacific Games

References

2019 Pacific Games
2019